Currituck County Courthouse and Jail is a historic courthouse and jail located at Currituck, Currituck County, North Carolina. The original two-story section of the courthouse was built about 1842, enlarged in 1897, and a rear wing was added in 1952.  The 1897 remodeling added a second floor to the original one-story wings and Classical Revival style design elements. The jail was built about 1857, and is a two-story, rectangular building with 32 inch thick brick walls.  It is one of the oldest extant jails in North Carolina. 

It was listed on the National Register of Historic Places in 1979.

Gallery

References

Currituck, North Carolina
County courthouses in North Carolina
Courthouses on the National Register of Historic Places in North Carolina
Neoclassical architecture in North Carolina
Government buildings completed in 1842
Buildings and structures in Currituck County, North Carolina
National Register of Historic Places in Currituck County, North Carolina